Starbenders are an American rock band from the suburbs of Atlanta, Georgia. The group was formed in 2013 when lead singer and guitarist Kimi Shelter contacted her former bandmate Aaron Lecesne about doing a new project. After adding guitarist Kriss Tokaji and drummer Emily Moon, Starbenders were subsequently signed to former Lady Gaga music director/guitarist Nico Constantine’s label, Institution Records. With Constantine serving as their producer, the band has released three EPs, one full-length, one 7-inch, and six singles on Institution Records and two singles and one full-length on Sumerian Records.

Background
Starbenders released their self-titled debut EP, mixed by Jeff Bakos, in 2014 to positive reception with the lead-off single Touch and quickly followed with the singles Brake, Paper Beats Rock, and Powder in 2015 while touring the United States extensively. The band spent the remainder of 2015 recording 2016's full-length Heavy Petting, which was released by Institution Records. The record was engineered by Matt Goldman at Glow-In-The-Dark Studios and Jeff Bakos at Studio B, and mixed by Mark Needham (Fleetwood Mac, The Killers, Stevie Nicks) and Will Brierre (Sick Puppies, Imagine Dragons).

The band led with the single Blood and released a music video for the track, followed by videos for Paper Beats Rock, Powder, and Time Stops, which won "Best Music Video" at the 2016 Oregon Film Awards.

Starbenders continued to be active through 2017, touring and releasing the singles Far From Heaven and So High, (again mixed by Needham). In late 2017 the band began work on their new EP JULIAN and released the title track Julian as a single in advance of the EP's official release in January 2018.

Starbenders toured extensively in 2018 in support of JULIAN, notably touring alongside Charlotte Kemp Muhl's UNI, Rosegarden Funeral Party on the Children Of The Night tour, and Alice in Chains in support of the grunge icons' new record Rainier Fog.

In 2018 Starbenders signed a distribution deal with Japanese label B.I.J Records for Japanese releases. In April 2019, the band released the EP Japanese Rooms and embarked on an extensive tour of Japan to support the EP. Despite only being available in physical copies in Japan, the EP was named LA Weekly's "Album Of The Week."

In May of 2019, it was announced that Starbenders had signed to Sumerian Records, and the band's first single and video on the label, "London," was released to positive reception. The band then embarked on a US tour with labelmates Palaye Royale. Starbenders continued to tour through 2019, supporting Jamie Bower's band Counterfeit on a North American tour and releasing the single "Holy Mother" in September.

Starbenders began 2020 with a US tour with Asking Alexandria frontman Danny Worsnop. On February 14, they released their debut full-length on Sumerian Records, Love Potions, produced by longtime producer Nico Constantine. Reflecting on the thirteen months it took the band to record the album, Kimi Shelter revealed, "We really just put our all into it. We wanted to come in old-school with it, and make sure that we were really honouring the ghosts of rock'n'roll past. It was frustrating, but the process really made us. It was both parts: beauty and pain."

Charitable causes
Starbenders regularly advocates various charitable causes through music and performances. Charities and non-profits worked with include Children Of The Night, Girls Rock Camp, Open Door Inc, Lost N Found Youth, and My Sister's House.

Discography

Studio albums
 Heavy Petting (2016)
Love Potions (2020)

EPs
 Starbenders (2014)
 Julian (2018)
Japanese Rooms (2019)

7-inch
 "Powder" (2015)

Singles
 "Brake" (2016)
 "Blood" (2016)
 "So High" (2017)
 "Far From Heaven" (2017)
 "Down and Out" (2017)
 "1969" (2017)
 "Julian" (2017)
 "21st Century Orphan" (2018)
 "Never Lie 2 Me" (2019)
 "London" (2019)
 "Holy Mother" (2019)
 "Cover Me" (2020)
 "One of Us" (2020)
 "Push" (2020)
 "Can't Cheat Time" (2020)
 "Bitches Be Witches" (2020)
 "No One Listened" (2021)
 "Seven White Horses" (2022)
 "If You Need It" (2022)
 "The Game" (2023)

References

Rock music groups from Georgia (U.S. state)
Musical groups from Atlanta